In a mirror furnace, material is heated by the lamps whose radiation is focused by mirrors. They are widely used for growing single crystals for scientific purposes, using the "floating zone" method.

See also 
 Solar furnace

External links 
 Pictures and diagrams of single crystal growth from the Ceramic Single-Crystal Growth Laboratory at Cornell University

Crystallography